Franjo Maixner (August 4, 1841 – March 2, 1903) was a Croatian university professor and rector of the University of Zagreb.

Born in Osijek, he graduated philosophy at the Charles University in Prague. In 1886, he founded a Seminar for Classical Philology (today Department for Classical Philology) at the Faculty of Humanities and Social Sciences, University of Zagreb, holding a position of the first professor. In the academic year 1878/1879 he served as a rector of the University of Zagreb, and after his rectorship mandate expired, as a prorector of the Royal University of Franz Joseph in Zagreb. Up until 1888 he alone conducted all the teaching activity at the newly established department, including the courses on Latin language and literature. He became full member of the Yugoslav Academy of Sciences and Arts in 1882.

Maixner wrote works on grammar, Classical literature and archeology. Of the classical authors, he chiefly studied Cicero. He also studied Croatian latinistic literature. He died in Zagreb.

References
 Maixner's biography, at the University of Zagreb website

1841 births
1903 deaths
People from Osijek
Rectors of the University of Zagreb
Academic staff of the University of Zagreb
Members of the Croatian Academy of Sciences and Arts
Charles University alumni
Burials at Mirogoj Cemetery